Hypertext is text displayed on a computer or other electronic device with references (hyperlinks) to other text that the reader can immediately access, usually by a mouse click or keypress sequence. Early conceptions of hypertext defined it  as text that could be connected by a linking system to a range of other documents that were stored outside that text. In 1934 Belgian bibliographer, Paul Otlet, developed a blueprint for links that telescoped out from hypertext electrically to allow readers to access documents, books, photographs, and so on, stored anywhere in the world.

History
Recorders of information have long looked for ways to categorize and compile it. There are various methods of arranging layers of references/annotations within a document. Other reference works (for example dictionaries, encyclopaedias) also developed a precursor to hypertext: the setting of certain words in small capital letters, indicating that an entry existed for that term within the same reference work. Sometimes the term would be preceded by an index, ☞like this, or an arrow, ➧like this. Janet Murray has referenced Jorge Luis Borges' "The Garden of Forking Paths" as a precursor to the hypertext novel and aesthetic:
"The concept Borges described in 'The Garden of Forking Paths'—in several layers of the story, but most directly in the combination book and maze of Ts'ui Pen—is that of a novel that can be read in multiple ways, a hypertext novel. Borges described this in 1941, prior to the invention (or at least the public disclosure) of the electromagnetic digital computer. Borges also mentions how hypertext has three  similarities of frued to a labyrinth in which each link brings the navigator to a set of new links, in an ever expanding maze. Not only did he invent the hypertext novel—Borges went on to describe a theory of the universe based upon the structure of such a novel." —Wardrip-Fruin and Montfort

Umberto Eco has also referenced Finnegans Wake in the same way.

Later, several scholars entered the scene who believed that humanity was drowning in information, causing foolish decisions and duplicating efforts among scientists. These scholars proposed or developed proto-hypertext systems predating electronic computer technology. For example, in the early 20th century, two visionaries attacked the cross-referencing problem through proposals based on labor-intensive, brute force methods. Paul Otlet proposed a proto-hypertext concept based on his monographic principle, in which all documents would be decomposed down to unique phrases stored on index cards. In the 1930s, H.G. Wells proposed the creation of a World Brain.

Michael Buckland summarized the very advanced pre-World War II development of microfilm based on rapid retrieval devices, specifically the microfilm based workstation proposed by Leonard Townsend in 1938 and the microfilm and photoelectronic based selector, patented by Emanuel Goldberg in 1931. Buckland concluded: "The pre-war information retrieval specialists of continental Europe, the 'documentalists,' largely disregarded by post-war information retrieval specialists, had ideas that were considerably more advanced than is now generally realized." But, like the manual index card model, these microfilm devices provided rapid retrieval based on pre-coded indices and classification schemes published as part of the microfilm record without including the link model which distinguishes the modern concept of hypertext from content or category based information retrieval.

The Memex

All major histories of what we now call hypertext start in 1945, when Vannevar Bush wrote an article in The Atlantic Monthly called "As We May Think", about a futuristic device he called a Memex. He described the device as an electromechanical desk linked to an extensive archive of microfilms, able to display books, writings, or any document from a library. The Memex would also be able to create 'trails' of linked and branching sets of pages, combining pages from the published microfilm library with personal annotations or additions captured on a microfilm recorder. Bush's vision was based on extensions of 1945 technology—microfilm recording and retrieval in this case. However, the modern story of hypertext starts with the Memex because "As We May Think" directly influenced and inspired the two American men generally credited with the invention of hypertext, Ted Nelson and Douglas Engelbart.

The invention of hypertext

Starting in 1963, Ted Nelson developed a model for creating and using linked content he called "hypertext" and "hypermedia" (first published reference 1965). Ted Nelson said in the 1960s that he began implementation of a hypertext system he theorized which was named Project Xanadu, but his first and incomplete public release was finished much later, in 1998. He later worked with Andries van Dam to develop the Hypertext Editing System (HES) in 1967 at Brown University. HES was the first hypertext system available on commercial equipment that novices could use, and it didn't have arbitrary limits on text lengths.

Douglas Engelbart independently began working on his NLS system in 1962 at Stanford Research Institute, although delays in obtaining funding, personnel, and equipment meant that its key features were not completed until 1968. In December of that year, Engelbart demonstrated a hypertext interface to the public for the first time, in what has come to be known as "The Mother of All Demos". Funding for NLS slowed after 1974.

Later in 1968, van Dam's team incorporated ideas from NLS into a successor to HES: the File Retrieval and Editing System (FRESS), which was the first hypertext system to run on readily-available commercial hardware and OS. The user interface was simpler than NLS.
By 1976 FRESS received NEH funding and was used in a poetry class in which students could browse and annotate a hyperlinked set of poems and discussion by experts, faculty and other students, in what was arguably the first online scholarly community, which van Dam says "foreshadowed wikis, blogs and communal documents of all kinds".

Influential work in the following decade included NoteCards at Xerox PARC and ZOG at Carnegie Mellon. ZOG started in 1972 as an artificial intelligence research project under the supervision of Allen Newell, and pioneered the "frame" or "card" model of hypertext. ZOG was deployed in 1982 on the U.S.S. Carl Vinson and later commercialized as Knowledge Management System. Two other influential hypertext projects from the early 1980s were Ben Shneiderman's The Interactive Encyclopedia System (TIES) at the University of Maryland (1983) and Intermedia at Brown University (1984).

Early hypertext applications
The first hypermedia application was the Aspen Movie Map in 1978. In 1980, Tim Berners-Lee created ENQUIRE, an early hypertext database system somewhat like a wiki. The early 1980s also saw a number of experimental hypertext and hypermedia programs, many of whose features and terminology were later integrated into the Web. Guide was the first significant hypertext system for personal computers. In 1983, a hypermedia authoring tool, Tutor-Tech, designed for Apple II computers, was produced for educators.

In August 1987, Apple Computer released HyperCard for the Macintosh line at the MacWorld convention. Its impact, combined with interest in Peter J. Brown's GUIDE (marketed by OWL and released earlier that year) and Brown University's Intermedia, led to broad interest in and enthusiasm for hypertext and new media. The first ACM Hypertext academic conference took place in November 1987, in Chapel Hill NC, where many other applications, including the hypertext literature writing software Storyspace were also demoed

Meanwhile, Nelson, who had been working on and advocating his Xanadu system for over two decades, along with the commercial success of HyperCard, stirred Autodesk to invest in his revolutionary ideas. The project continued at Autodesk for four years, but no product was released.

van Dam's research groups at Brown University continued working as well. For example, in the late '70s Steve Feiner and others developed an ebook system for Navy repair manuals, and in the early '80s Norm Meyrowitz and a large team at Brown's Institute for Research in Information and Scholarship built Intermedia (mentioned above), which was heavily used in humanities and literary computing. In '89 van Dam's helped Lou Reynolds and van Dam's former students Steven DeRose and Jeff Vogel spun off Electronic Book Technologies, whose SGML-based hypertext system DynaText was widely used for large online publishing and e-book projects, such as online documentation for Sun, SGI, HP, Novell, and DEC, as well as aerospace, transport, publishing, and other applications. Brown's Center For Digital Scholarship  (née Scholarly Technology Group) was heavily involved in related standards efforts such as the Text Encoding Initiative, Open eBook and XML, as well as enabling a wide variety of humanities hypertext projects.

Hypertext and the World Wide Web
In the late 1980s, Berners-Lee, then a scientist at CERN, invented the World Wide Web to meet the demand for simple and immediate information-sharing among physicists working at CERN and different universities or institutes all over the world.

In 1992, Lynx was born as an early Internet web browser. Its ability to provide hypertext links within documents that could reach into documents anywhere on the Internet began the creation of the Web on the Internet.

Early in 1993, the National Center for Supercomputing Applications (NCSA) at the University of Illinois released the first version of their Mosaic web browser to supplement the two existing web browsers: one that ran only on NeXTSTEP and one that was only minimally user-friendly. Because it could display and link graphics as well as text, Mosaic quickly became the replacement for Lynx. Mosaic ran in the X Window System environment, which was then popular in the research community, and offered usable window-based interactions. It allowed images as well as text to anchor hypertext links. It also incorporated other protocols intended to coordinate information across the Internet, such as Gopher.

After the release of web browsers for both the PC and Macintosh environments, traffic on the World Wide Web quickly exploded from only 500 known web servers in 1993 to over 10,000 in 1994. Thus, all earlier hypertext systems were overshadowed by the success of the Web, even though it originally lacked many features of those earlier systems, such as an easy way to edit what you were reading, typed links, backlinks, transclusion, and source tracking.

In 1995, Ward Cunningham made the first wiki available, making the Web more hypertextual by adding easy editing, and (within a single wiki) backlinks and limited source tracking. It also added the innovation of making it possible to link to pages that did not yet exist. Wiki developers continue to implement novel features as well as those developed or imagined in the early explorations of hypertext but not included in the original web.

See also
Timeline of hypertext technology
History of the Internet
History of the World Wide Web
HTML

References

External links
History of the word "Hypertext"
Historical Overview of Hypertext
The first use of hypertext (?) - TIFF image
A Brief History of Human Computer Interaction Technology

Hypertext
History of computing